Héctor Enrique Castellanos Villatoro (born 28 December 1992) is a Honduran professional footballer who plays as a midfielder for Motagua in the Liga Nacional de Honduras.

Club career

Victoria
At the age of 20, Castellanos made his debut with C.D. Victoria in the 2–1 victory over F.C. Motagua on 29 July 2012.  Playing for Victoria, he reached a final in the 2012–13 season, which they lost to Club Deportivo Olimpia.

Motagua
Castellanos signed for F.C. Motagua on 24 June 2015.  His first game with Motagua was against Mexican side Club América for the 2015–16 CONCACAF Champions League where they lost 0–4.  His league debut came four days later in the 5–1 victory over his former club C.D. Victoria.

International
He made his Honduras national football team on 9 June 2019 in a friendly against Brazil, as a 72nd-minute substitute for Luis Garrido.

References

External links

1992 births
Living people
Association football midfielders
Honduran footballers
Honduras international footballers
C.D. Victoria players
F.C. Motagua players
Liga Nacional de Fútbol Profesional de Honduras players
People from Tela
2019 CONCACAF Gold Cup players